Tongatapu is the main island of Tonga and the site of its capital, Nukualofa. Tongatapu is Tonga's centre of government and the seat of its monarchy.

Tongatapu has experienced more rapid economic development than the other islands of Tonga, and has thus attracted many internal migrants from them.

Geography

The island is covered with thick fertile soil consisting of volcanic ash from neighbouring volcanoes.

The almost completely closed Fanga'uta and Fangakakau Lagoons are important breeding grounds for birds and fish as they live within the mangroves growing around the lagoon's shores. The lagoons were declared a Natural Reserve in 1974 by the government.

Climate
Tongatapu has a rather cooler climate than the rest of Tonga as it is the southernmost group of islands in the country. Because of this, fruit production is lower in Tongatapu than it is in the warmer islands in the north.

History

People of the Lapita culture

Tongatapu is known as having one of the highest concentration of archaeological remains in the Pacific. The earliest traces of Lapita pottery found in Tonga was from around 900–850 BC, 300 years after the first settlements in Tonga were established.

From the first capital at Toloa, around 1000 years ago, to the second capital at Heketā, at the site of the Haamonga a Maui Trilithon, none boasts more traditional attractions than the third capital at Mua (from 1220–1851) with more than 20 royal grave mounds.

Europeans
Tongatapu was first sighted by Europeans on 20 January 1643 by Abel Tasman commanding two ships, the Heemskerck and the Zeehaen commissioned by the Dutch East India Company of Batavia (Jakarta). The expedition's goals were to chart the unknown southern and eastern seas and to find a possible passage through the South Pacific and Indian Ocean providing a faster route to Chile. The expedition set sail from Batavia on 14 August 1642. Tasman named the island "t’ Eijlandt Amsterdam" (Amsterdam Island), because of its abundance of supplies. This name is no longer used except by historians.

Commander James Cook, sailing the British vessel Resolution visited the island on October 2, 1773 by some accounts and by other accounts October 1774, returning again in 1777 , with Omai, whereupon they left some cattle for breeding. These were still flourishing in 1789 when Bounty, under Fletcher Christian visited.

The earliest mention of the name Tongatapu (spelled "Tongataboo" in the text) was by James Cook in 1777, as he wrote his memoirs for the Three Voyages Around the World, Volume 1.

British and American whalers were regular visitors to the island for provisions, water and wood. The first on record was the Hope, in April–May 1807. The last known to have called was the Albatross in November–December 1899.

Main sights

 Nukualofa – Capital of Tonga
 Mua – Second largest town in Tongatapu. Site of the ancient burial mounds and the Papae 'o Tele'a Tombs.
 Langi – Tombs of Tongan kings
 Hule fortress – Located in Nukunuku - Kolotau Ko Hule - Western District of Tongatapu
 Mapu a Vaea – Blowholes in the coral reef on the south-western side
 Hūfangalupe – Natural landbridge on the south eastern side of Tongatapu
 Pangaimotu – Small resort island close to Nukualofa
 Landing site of Captain Cook
 Flying Fox Preserve – Located in Kolovai in the western side Taungapeka
 Haamonga a Maui – Trilithon
 Nukuleka – possibly the site of first Lapita settlement in Tonga
 Tupou College – first educational establishment in the kingdom located in the eastern district of Tongatapu near Malapo

See also
 List of islands and towns in Tonga

References

External links

 Tonga Quick Facts
 Photographs from Tongatapu, Tonga
 The European discovery of the Tonga Islands  by Brian Hooker
 

 
Islands of Tonga
Divisions of Tonga